Francis Orlando Wilcox (April 9, 1908 – February 20, 1985) was an official in the United States Department of State.

Biography

Francis O. Wilcox was born in Columbus Junction, Iowa on April 9, 1908.  He was educated at the University of Iowa, receiving his A.B. in 1930, his A.M. in 1931, and his Ph.D. in 1933.  He then attended the University of Geneva and the Graduate Institute of International Studies, and received a doctorate in political science in 1935.  From 1935 through 1941, he taught political science at the University of Iowa, the University of Louisville, the University of Chicago, and the University of Michigan.

Wilcox joined the United States Department of State in 1942.  From 1947 through 1951, he was the first chief of staff of the United States Senate Committee on Foreign Relations.  During this time, the Committee oversaw the United States' involvement in the creation of NATO and the Marshall Plan.

In 1955, President of the United States Dwight D. Eisenhower nominated Wilcox as Assistant Secretary of State for International Organization Affairs and, after Senate confirmation, Wilcox served in this office from September 6, 1955 through January 20, 1961.  In this capacity, he had primary responsibility for United States involvement in the United Nations.

Leaving government service in 1961, Wilcox became dean of the Johns Hopkins University's School of Advanced International Studies.  He became dean emeritus in 1973.

Wilcox died of a heart attack on February 20, 1985.  He was survived by his wife, Virginia, two children and two granddaughters.

References

"Francis O. Wilcox, 76; Ex-State Dept. Official", The New York Times, February 23, 1985
Wilcox's Papers at the University of Iowa

1908 births
1961 deaths
United States Assistant Secretaries of State
People from Columbus Junction, Iowa
University of Iowa alumni
University of Geneva alumni
Graduate Institute of International and Development Studies alumni
University of Iowa faculty
University of Louisville faculty
University of Chicago faculty
University of Michigan faculty
Johns Hopkins University people